Pablo César Pintos Cabral (born 1 July 1987) is an Uruguayan footballer who plays for CA Cerro.

Career
Pintos began his playing career in 2006 with Defensor, he was part of two championship winning squads during his time at the club. They won the Apertura 2007 championship, Uruguayan Championship 2008, and Clausura 2009 championship. He scored a total of 4 goals in 67 appearances for the club in all competitions.

In 2009 Pintos joined Argentine club San Lorenzo de Almagro by signing 50% rights for reported US$700,000 to $800,000. He made his competitive debut for the club on 18 August 2009 in a 2–1 away defeat to Club Atlético Tigre in Copa Sudamericana 2009. On his league debut for San Lorenzo, Pintos scored his first goal for the club in a 3–1 win against Atlético Tucumán on 22 August 2009.

In summer 2010 Pintos was signed by Lazio, but new non-EU policy of Italian Football Federation made Lazio unable to register two non-EU new signing after signed Hernanes. Instead, Pintos signed a contract with club Getafe.

Pintos signed with the San Jose Earthquakes in September 2014, and was released the following February after a short stint with the club.

Honours

References

External links
 
 
 
 
 Argentine Primera statistics at Futbol XXI 

1987 births
Living people
Footballers from Montevideo
Uruguayan footballers
Association football midfielders
Uruguayan Primera División players
Defensor Sporting players
Argentine Primera División players
Major League Soccer players
San Lorenzo de Almagro footballers
Club Atlético Tigre footballers
S.S. Lazio players
La Liga players
Getafe CF footballers
Süper Lig players
Kasımpaşa S.K. footballers
San Jose Earthquakes players
Liverpool F.C. (Montevideo) players
C.A. Cerro players
Uruguayan expatriate footballers
Expatriate footballers in Argentina
Expatriate footballers in Italy
Expatriate footballers in Spain
Expatriate footballers in Turkey
Expatriate soccer players in the United States
Uruguayan expatriate sportspeople in Turkey